Wiidakko are a Finnish indie rock band that was formed in Lahti, Finland in 2003. The group has released three studio albums Uusi järjestys (2006), Asiat joita et voi koskaan saavuttaa (2008) and Wiidakko (2011).

Wiidakko made their breakthrough in an annual band contest Ääni ja Vimma (Sound and Fury) in 2004.Ääni ja Vimma 2004, freeyourmind.fi (in Finnish) Their first single reached #7 in the Finnish Charts in February 2006.Suomen virallinen lista - Singlet 8/2006, ifpi.fi (in Finnish) All of their three albums have been Albums of the Week on the national YleX radio station.YleX:n Viikon Albumi: Wiidakko - Wiidakko, ylex.fi (in Finnish)

Discography

Albums

 Uusi järjestys (2006 Parlophone)
 Asiat joita et voi koskaan saavuttaa (2008 Parlophone)
 Wiidakko (2011)

Singles

 980 ongelmaa (2006)
 Thalarctos maritimus (2006)
 Alaikäinen (2006)
 Niin (2007)
 Jokainen hyvästi on liikaa (2008)
 Äänet (2008)
 Seis seis seis (2011)
 Odessa (2011)

EPs

 Kipinät (2003)
 Sekunnin (2004)
 Jännite (2004)
 Wiidakko EP (2005)

References

External links

Finnish alternative rock groups
Musical groups established in 2003
Finnish indie rock groups